Dokkfløyvatn or Dokkfløyvatnet is a lake which lies in the municipalities of Gausdal and Nordre Land in Innlandet county, Norway. The  lake lies along the river Dokka and the Dokkfløy Dam on the river created the lake. The water from the lake is piped through tunnels to the nearby hydroelectric power station.

There have been many archaeological discoveries made in the area. Prior to the damming of the lake, archaeological investigations began in 1978. In the dam area alone, archaeologists found 121 moose traps, 90 iron mining facilities, and evidence of 68 Stone Age settlements. Using the C14 method, the oldest of these discoveries were dated to be over 9000 years old.

See also
List of lakes in Norway

References

Gausdal
Nordre Land
Lakes of Innlandet